Banaue (or alternatively spelled as Banawe), officially the Municipality of Banaue  is a 4th class municipality in the province of Ifugao, Philippines. According to the 2020 census, it has a population of 20,652 people.

It is widely known as the site of the UNESCO World Heritage Site, the Batad Rice Terraces and Bangaan Rice Terraces.

History

Geography

Barangays
Banaue is politically subdivided into 18 barangays. These barangays are headed by elected officials: Barangay Captain, Barangay Council, whose members are called Barangay Councilors. All are elected every three years.

Climate

Demographics

Economy

Government
Banaue, belonging to the lone congressional district of the province of Ifugao, is governed by a mayor designated as its local chief executive and by a municipal council as its legislative body in accordance with the Local Government Code. The mayor, vice mayor, and the councilors are elected directly by the people through an election which is being held every three years.

Elected officials

Ifugao Rice Terraces

Sometimes called by locals as the "Eighth Wonder of the World", the Ifugao Rice Terraces begin at the base of the mountain range and extend several thousand feet upwards. Two of the terrace clusters in Banaue, namely Bangaan and Batad, are part of the UNESCO World Heritage inscription. It is said that their length, if put end to end, would encircle half of the globe. The terraces are believed by many to be more than 2,000 years old as postulated by early Philippine anthropologist Otley Beyer, recent studies by carbon dating however contends this and instead the structures may be less than 1,000 years old. The rice terraces manifest the engineering skill and ingenuity of the sturdy Ifugaos. They are irrigated by means of mountain streams and springs that have been tapped and channelled into canals that run downhill through the rice terraces.

The rice terraces once stretched north-east to Cagayan and as far south as Quezon. However they are now slowly being abandoned and showing signs of deterioration. The 1990 Luzon earthquake damaged some of the terraces' irrigation systems, while El Niño triggered droughts that led giant earthworms to erode the terraces' soil. Furthermore, the rice variety most suited to the area's cool climate is not a high-yielding crop; because it takes so long to mature, some Ifugao families have abandoned their land in the rice terraces in favour of land that reaps faster rewards.

An Ifugao Terraces Commission was created in 1994 and was superseded by the Banaue Rice Terraces task force, which was closed in 2002.

UNESCO has listed the Batad Rice Terraces and Bangaan Rice Terraces as a World Heritage Site since 1995, under the designation, Rice Terraces of the Philippine Cordilleras.

All located in the Ifugao region, the Rice Terraces also feature as one of the Globally Important Agricultural Heritage Systems or GIAHS. They are supported by indigenous knowledge management of muyong, a private forest that caps each terrace cluster. The muyong is managed through a collective effort and under traditional tribal practices. The communally managed forestry area on top of the terraces contains about 264 indigenous plant species, mostly endemic to the region. The terraces form unique clusters of microwatersheds and are part of the whole mountain ecology. They serve as a rainwater filtration system and are saturated with irrigation water all year round. A biorhythm technology, in which cultural activities are harmonised with the rhythm of climate and hydrology management, has enabled farmers to grow rice at over 1 000 metres.

Contrary to popular notion, the Banaue Rice Terraces as seen from the viewpoint are not included in the UNESCO inscription, due to the presence of numerous modern structures. However, it is a National Cultural Treasure under the Ifugao Rice Terraces.

The Banaue Rice Terraces were chosen as one of the two green globe destinations of the country by the World Travel and Tour Council. It received an “International Historic Engineering Landmark Award” from the American Society of Civil Engineers. It was also acknowledged by the World Travel and Tour Council as a green globe destination in the Philippines.

The stone walled rice terraces were built by means of early tools and methods in order to maximise the use of land space, They exceed the height of the world's tallest building if the vertical distance between top and bottom row are measured.

See also
Banaue Rice Terraces

References

External links

 
 [ Philippine Standard Geographic Code]
Philippine Census Information
Local Governance Performance Management System

Municipalities of Ifugao